Tim Rubink (born 12 January 1988 in Dormagen) is a German footballer who currently plays for Goslarer SC.

Career
He made his debut in the Fußball-Bundesliga for the main Borussia squad on 8 November 2006, when he started the game against FC Schalke 04 and was substituted at halftime.

References

1988 births
Living people
German footballers
Borussia Mönchengladbach players
Borussia Mönchengladbach II players
Bayer 04 Leverkusen II players
SV Sandhausen players
People from Dormagen
Sportspeople from Düsseldorf (region)
Bundesliga players
3. Liga players
Association football defenders
Footballers from North Rhine-Westphalia